Title 7 of the United States Code outlines the role of agriculture in the United States Code.

Chapters 
 : Commodity Exchanges
 : Cotton Standards
 : Grain Standards
 : Naval Stores
 : Importation of Adulterated Seeds
 : Insecticides and Environmental Pesticide Control
 : National Laboratory Accreditation
 : Insect Pests Generally
 : Golden Nematode
 : Plant Pests
 : Nursery Stock and Other Plants and Plant Products
 : Rubber and Other Critical Agricultural Materials
 : Packers and Stockyards
 : Warehouses
 : Honeybees
 : Associations of Agricultural Products Producers
 : Agricultural and Mechanical Colleges
 : Agricultural Experiment Stations
 : Bureau of Animal Industry
 : Bureau of Dairy Industry
 : Miscellaneous Matters
 : Cooperative Marketing
 : Cotton Statistics and Estimates
 : Dumping or Destruction of Interstate Produce
 : Perishable Agricultural Commodities
 : Tobacco Statistics
 : Tobacco Inspection
 : Tobacco Control
 : Agricultural Marketing
 : Foreign Agricultural Service
 : Perishable Agricultural Commodities
 : Export Standards for Apples
 : Export Standards for Grapes and Plums
 : Agricultural Adjustment
 : Agricultural Marketing Agreements
 : Cotton Marketing
 : Tobacco Industry
 : Potato Act of 1935
 : Anti-Hog-Cholera Serum and Hog-Cholera Virus
 : Rural Electrification and Telephone Service
 : Telemedicine and Distance Learning Services in Rural Areas
 : Peanut Statistics
 : Farm Tenancy
 : Sugar Production and Control
 : Agricultural Adjustment Act of 1938
 : Price Support of Agricultural Commodities
 : Crop Insurance
 : Seeds
 : Distribution and Marketing of Agricultural Products
 : Stabilization of International Wheat Market
 : Halogeton Glomeratus Control
 : Agricultural Trade Development and Assistance
 : Agricultural Commodity Set-Aside
 : Foreign Market Development
 : Wool Program
 : Soil Bank Program
 : Surplus Disposal of Agricultural Commodities
 : Interchange of Department of Agriculture and State Employees
 : Humane Methods of Livestock Slaughter
 : Consultation on Agricultural Programs
 : Agricultural Credit
 : Food Stamp Program
 : Farm Labor Contractor Registration
 : Cotton Research and Promotion
 : Transportation, Sale, and Handling of Certain Animals
 : Department of Agriculture
 : Department of Agriculture Advisory Committees
 : Unfair Trade Practices Affecting Producers of Agricultural Products
 : Plant Variety Protection
 : Potato Research and Promotion
 : Rural Fire Protection, Development, and Small Farm Research and Education
 : Egg Research and Consumer Information
 : Noxious Weeds
 : Beef Research and Information
 : Farmer-To-Consumer Direct Marketing
 : Agricultural Research, Extension, and Teaching
 : Wheat and Wheat Foods Research and Nutrition Education
 : Agricultural Foreign Investment Disclosure
 : Implementation of International Sugar Agreement, 1977
 : Agricultural Subterminal Facilities
 : Swine Health Protection
 : Animal Cancer Research
 : Agricultural Trade Suspension Adjustment
 : National Agricultural Cost of Production Standards Review Board
 : Farmland Protection Policy
 : Floral Research and Consumer Information
 : International Carriage of Perishable Foodstuffs
 : Dairy Research and Promotion
 : Honey Research, Promotion, and Consumer Information
 : Agricultural Productivity Research
 : Pork Promotion, Research, and Consumer Information
 : Watermelon Research and Promotion
 : National Commission on Agriculture and Rural Development Policy
 : State Agricultural Loan Mediation Programs
 : Agricultural Competitiveness and Trade
 : National Nutrition Monitoring and Related Research
 : Administration of Environmental Programs
 : Water Quality Research, Education, and Coordination
 : Export Promotion
 : Research
 : Pecan Promotion and Research
 : Mushroom Promotion, Research, and Consumer Information
 : Lime Promotion, Research, and Consumer Information
 : Soybean Promotion, Research, and Consumer Information
 : Processor-Funded Milk Promotion Program
 : Organic Certification
 : Rural Revitalization Through Forestry
 : Global Climate Change
 : Fresh Cut Flowers and Fresh Cut Greens Promotion and Information
 : Department of Agriculture Reorganization
 : Sheep Promotion, Research, and Information
 : Agricultural Market Transition
 : Agricultural Promotion
 : Emergency Food Assistance
 : Agricultural Research, Extension, and Education Reform
 : Plant Protection
 : Hass Avocado Promotion, Research, and Information

References

External links
U.S. Code Title 7, via United States Government Printing Office
U.S. Code Title 7, via Cornell University

07
Title 07